Harold Arnold Ackerman (February 15, 1928 – December 2, 2009) was a United States district judge of the United States District Court for the District of New Jersey.

Education and career

Ackerman was born in Newark, New Jersey and raised in nearby Irvington, where he graduated from Irvington High School before earning his undergraduate degree at Seton Hall University. He received a Bachelor of Laws from Rutgers Law School in 1951. He engaged in the private practice of law in New Jersey from 1951 to 1954. From 1955 to 1979, he was a judge on various New Jersey courts - on the Compensation Court of the State of New Jersey (1955–1965); the Union County District Court (to 1970); the Union County Court until (to 1973); the Superior Court, Law Division (to 1975); and the Superior Court, Chancery Division, General Equity (to 1979).

Federal judicial service

On September 28, 1979, Ackerman was nominated by President Jimmy Carter to a seat on the United States District Court for the District of New Jersey, vacated by Judge George H. Barlow. He was confirmed by the United States Senate on October 31, 1979, and received his commission on November 2, 1979. He assumed senior status on February 15, 1994, serving in that capacity until his death on December 2, 2009, at his home in West Orange, New Jersey.

See also
 List of Jewish American jurists

References

Sources

External links
 An oral history interview of Judge Ackerman was conducted by the Historical Society for the U.S. District Court of the District of New Jersey on December 26, 2007.
 

Rutgers School of Law–Newark alumni
1928 births
2009 deaths
Irvington High School (New Jersey) alumni
People from Irvington, New Jersey
People from West Orange, New Jersey
Rutgers University alumni
Seton Hall University alumni
Judges of the United States District Court for the District of New Jersey
United States district court judges appointed by Jimmy Carter
20th-century American judges
New Jersey state court judges
Politicians from Newark, New Jersey
New Jersey lawyers
Superior court judges in the United States
Lawyers from Newark, New Jersey